The Abu Dhabi International Book Fair is an annual book fair held in Abu Dhabi. It provides a platform where publishers, booksellers, agents, cultural organisations and press can meet, exchange ideas and identify business opportunities. Since 2007 it has been organised by KITAB, a joint venture between the Abu Dhabi Authority for Culture and Heritage and the Frankfurt Book Fair. 

The ADIBF forms part of KITAB’s strategy to transform Abu Dhabi into a major centre in the publishing world. The 2009 fair hosted 637 publishing houses from 52 countries with a record number of visitors, with 200,000 attending over the six days.  2010:  840 exhibitors  from  63 countries.

The ADIBF brings together the Arab and International publishing communities. The fair provides access to publishers in the entire MENA region, and as such is an important event in the negotiation and sale of book rights and licensing. In 2009/10 KITAB and ADACH launched the Spotlight on Rights Programme, which awards a subsidy of $1000 towards costs to encourage the negotiation of licenses to and from the Arabic language. The fair also hosts events as part of its ongoing Cultural (KITAB Sofa) and Professional Programme.

2010 Fair

The 2010 fair was  the 20th ADIBF  from 2 – 7 March at the Abu Dhabi National Exhibition Centre, UAE.
7th IPA Copyright Symposium was hosted by KITAB on the eve of the 2010 fair. The Symposium  took place in Abu Dhabi from 28 February to 1 March 2010, before the Abu Dhabi International Book Fair commenced on 2 March. It aimed to “provide a talking shop for representatives of all aspects of the publishing world to discuss issues at the forefront of copyright protection and enforcement globally today.” 

(Mark Linz,  American University in Cairo Press).

2011 Fair
22. -  27. March.

See also 
 Abu Dhabi Authority for Culture & Heritage
 Frankfurt Book Fair
 Sharjah International Book Fair

External links 

 

Book fairs in the United Arab Emirates
Spring (season) events in the United Arab Emirates